Asparagus densiflorus, the asparagus fern, plume asparagus or foxtail fern, is a variable evergreen perennial plant, closely related to the vegetable asparagus.

It is native to southern Africa, from Mozambique to South Africa, but is widely cultivated.

Related species
It is part of a group of similar and related African Asparagus species, including Asparagus aethiopicus ("Sprenger's asparagus"), Asparagus confertus and Asparagus krebsianus.

A. densiflorus has been confused with A. aethiopicus, now regarded as a separate very thorny species, so the information under that name will often refer to A. densiflorus. The plant formerly often grown as A. densiflorus 'Sprengeri' is indeed A. densiflorus, while the plant known as A. densiflorus 'Myersii' remains A. densiflorus as well.

Cultivation
As it cannot tolerate frost, in temperate regions A.densiflorus is usually grown under glass. Numerous cultivars have been developed, of which the compact form 'Myersii' has gained the Royal Horticultural Society's Award of Garden Merit. Its dense 50 cm plumes of foliage are especially valued in flower arranging.

References

Further reading
  - information on the 'Cwebe' cultivar
  - information on the 'Meyersii' cultivar

densiflorus
Flora of Southern Africa
Flora of Mozambique
Plants described in 1850
Taxa named by Carl Sigismund Kunth